The year 1985 was the 14th year after the independence of Bangladesh. It was also the fourth year of the Government of Hussain Muhammad Ershad.

Incumbents

 President: Hussain Muhammad Ershad
 Prime Minister: Ataur Rahman Khan
 Chief Justice: F.K.M. Munim

Demography

Climate

Economy

Note: For the year 1985 average official exchange rate for BDT was 27.99 per US$.

Events

 13 February – Raufun Basunia, Joint Secretary of Bangladesh Chhatra League, and the General Secretary of its University of Dhaka branch was shot dead during a clash between Chhatra Sangram Parishad and Chhatra Samaj, the ruling Jatiyo Party backed student wing in front of Mohsin Hall at University of Dhaka.
 21 March – A referendum on military rule was held in order to confirm the military rule of Hussain Mohammed Ershad. The referendum asked voters "Do you support the policies of President Ershad, and do you want him to continue to run this administration  until a civilian government is formed through elections?" The result saw 94.5% vote in favour, with a turnout of 72.2%. The opposition organised a general strike on the day of the referendum, and alleged that the results were fraudulent.
 Heavy mortars were used in an exchange of fire between Bangladeshi and Indian forces on a disputed section of the border between the two nations.
 22 November – The MOU between Bangladesh and India regarding Ganges water sharing was extended for three years.
 8 December – The first SAARC summit was held in Dhaka, Bangladesh on 6–8 December 1985 and was attended by the Government representative and president of Bangladesh, Maldives, Pakistan and Sri Lanka, the kings of Bhutan and Nepal, and the prime minister of India. They signed the SAARC Charter on 8 December 1985, thereby establishing the regional association, and established study groups on the problems of terrorism and drug trafficking, as well as planning a ministerial-level meeting about GATT, and a ministerial-level conference on increasing the participation of women at the regional level. The summit also agreed to establish a SAARC secretariat and adopted an official SAARC emblem.

Awards and recognitions

International Recognition
 Zafrullah Chowdhury, the founder of Gonoshasthaya Kendra, was awarded Ramon Magsaysay Award.

Independence Day Award
 Muhammad Ataul Gani Osmani was awarded posthumously for his contribution to social welfare.

Ekushey Padak
 Abu Zafar Obaidullah (literature)
 Gazi Shamsur Rahman (literature)
 Abdullah Al-Muti (science)
 Govinda Chandra Dev (education)
 Mohammad Abdul Jabbar (education)
 Kalim Sharafi (music)
 Abed Hossain Khan (music)
 Syed Jahangir (fine arts)

Sports
 South Asian (Federation) Games:
 Bangladesh hosted the second South Asian Federation Games held in Dhaka from 20–26 December. With 9 golds, 17 silvers and 38 bronzes Bangladesh ended the tournament at the third position in overall points table.
 Domestic football:
 Abahani KC won Dhaka League title while Brothers Union came out runner-up.
 Abahani KC also won Bangladesh Federation Cup title.

Births
 8 April – Masuma Rahman Nabila, actor
 1 November – Enamul Haque, footballer

Deaths
 15 March – Aroj Ali Matubbar, author (b. 1900)
 10 July – Ahsan Habib, poet (b. 1917)
 17 July – Abdul Hady Talukdar, academician (b. 1905)
 5 October – Abdus Sattar, former president (b. 1906)
 30 October – Fazle Lohani, journalist and TV host (b. 1929)
 4 December – Bijoy Sarkar, baul singer (b. 1903)

See also 
 1980s in Bangladesh
 Timeline of Bangladeshi history

References